The Cox Science Center and Aquarium is located in West Palm Beach, Florida. Founded in 1959, the goal of the organization is to open every mind to science through the strategic programming of interactive exhibits and engaging community-based camps and events. The Cox Center has expanded since its creation and now houses over 50 hands-on exhibits, a planetarium, a 3000 square foot aquarium, a miniature golf course, and a large exhibit space that displays a temporary travelling exhibit. The Cox Center is a member of the Association of Science-Technology Centers program, which offers a membership that is redeemable at other ASTC science and technology centers around the world. The Cox Center occupies Dreher Park alongside the Palm Beach Zoo and offers deals for entrance to both facilities.

The museum was previously known as the South Florida Science Center and Aquarium.

History 
The Junior Museum of Palm Beach County was founded in 1959 by the Junior League of the Palm Beaches to focus on the natural sciences. The museum opened on October 21, 1961 with exhibits of marine and animal life, geology, and agriculture. In 1964, a planetarium dedicated by astronaut Buzz Aldrin was completed. The Museum was expanded in 1971, doubling in size to accommodate classrooms, an auditorium, and an expanded exhibit floor. Renovations were done on the theatre and auditorium in the 1980s, and the museum became known as the South Florida Science Museum in order to reflect the more broad purpose of the museum as it had developed.

In 2008, the planetarium and theatre were renovated to accommodate more visitors. The South Florida Science Museum began expanding again in 2012, adding a 3000 square foot aquarium and a 3000 square foot permanent exhibit section containing the “River of Grass” Everglades exhibit and the NOAA Science on a Sphere exhibit. The grand re-opening of the renamed South Florida Science Center and Aquarium occurred on June 6, 2013. In 2015, the West wing of the Cox Center, the Hall of Discovery, was expanded and renovated to incorporate a nanotechnology exhibit and an early childhood education room. In 2016, an 18-hole miniature golf course designed by golf course architect Jim Fazio and professional golfer Gary Nicklaus was completed and opened to the public.

On November 15, 2021, leadership for the South Florida Science Center and Aquarium announced further expansion plans and a name change as part of a $45 million expansion campaign. A $20 million lead gift by Palm Beach residents Howard Ellis Cox Jr. and Wendy Cox launched the capital campaign to take the renamed Cox Science Center and Aquarium into the future with plans for an additional 130,000 total square feet of space for programming including science, technology, engineering and math (STEM) awareness and education. The Coxs’ gift is the largest single gift in the Center’s 60-year history and serves as the keystone for the $45 million expansion campaign.

Aquarium
The “Aquariums of the Atlantic” exhibit is a 3000 square foot area consisting of multiple tanks that house native Florida species, including Queen Angels, Pink Wrasse, sharks, seahorses, eels, stingrays, and some invasive species such as the Lionfish. The largest tank is “Shipwreck Cove,” a 3500 gallon tank which contains sharks, a spotted moray eel, white fin remoras, lobsters, and barracudas. Also available in the aquarium is a 6 ft coral reef tank that has a hollowed-out center which allows visitors to step into the center of the tank. The species in this tank are primarily from the Red Sea, Hawaiian Islands, Indo-Pacific, and Atlantic Ocean. Marine animals native to the Florida Everglades such as alligators and turtles are also on display in the aquarium. The aquarium operators host “Touch Tanks” which allow visitors a chance to feel some of the species of marine life in the aquarium.

Marvin Dekelboum Planetarium

The planetarium presents daily shows utilizing a traditional star projector, as well as full-dome digital video presentations on a variety of scientific topics.

Initially, founded in 1959, a new wing was built in 1964 to include the planetarium dedicated by and named after Buzz Aldrin.  In 2008, the planetarium and theater were renovated with funds from the Dekelboum Family Foundation and renamed after the Dekelboum Family.

In 2004, the Science Center received its largest donation from the Dekelboum Family Foundation for a new facility of $10 million - for every dollar raised for the new facility, the Foundation would match up to $10 million.  In 2005, the voters approved a $4 million cultural bond to help build the new facility.  The museum secured more than $20 million in funds to build the newly renamed Dekelboum Science Center and Dekelboum Planetarium.

Science On A Sphere

Events 
“Engineer it!” – Every year, the Cox Center hosts a contest which challenges entrants to engineer a series of devices. Entrants must build a container that will protect an egg from a 3 story fall, a roller coaster, a paper airplane, bottle rocket, and a water filtration system. Winners are chosen independently for each contest based on criteria such as weight of the system, efficiency, and height/distance.

“Nights at the Museum” – On the last Friday of every month, the Cox Center hosts an evening event which allows access to all of the daily operating exhibits as well as access to the observatory telescope for viewing of the stars. In addition, there are also booths set up for various groups to offer arts and crafts, face painting, and other activities. Each Night at The Museum is themed and children are encouraged to dress up to match the theme of the event.

GEMS Club – GEMS (Girls Excelling in Math and Science) club is a program offered to girls between third and eighth grade that occurs on the last Tuesday of every month from 5:00 to 7:00 P.M. The event offers various STEM (Science, Technology, Engineering, Math) related activities that help girls develop an interest in STEM.

“Science on Tap” – “Science on Tap” is a 21 and over event that offers a casual education session with free admission in which a presenter comes to talk about their field of research, with craft beer available for purchase during the presentation.

“Silver Science” – On the second Wednesday of every month, guests over the age of 60 receive a discounted admission rate which includes one planetarium show. The event also includes guest presenters which offer information on various topics.

Birthday Parties – The Cox Center hosts birthday parties on site during normal hours of operation. There are three tiers available for purchase which offer room rental, a party theme, and catering options. Purchase of the “Science 201” or “Science 301” packages includes a “Science Adventure,” which can be a marine touch tank, planetarium show, liquid nitrogen show, fossil necklace lab, or chemistry lab.

Facility Rentals – The Cox Center offers facility rentals outside of normal operating hours for events such as weddings, corporate meetings, or other celebrations.

Science and Technology Camps – The Cox Center has camp programs for children from ages 4 to 14 that take place in the summer. Each week has a different theme and activities. Summer camp takes place on site, with other camp programs available through the STEM Studio in Jupiter, Florida.

Exhibits

Traveling exhibits 
The Cox Center main exhibit floor is utilized by temporary traveling exhibits. These exhibits are typically open for six months before being changed. Past exhibits include an Egyptian themed “Mummies” exhibit, “Titanic,” and “Dinosaurs Around the World.” The most recent exhibit on display was “Astronaut,” which showed visitors the training and mission procedures for astronauts in the NASA program. The exhibit included a launch simulator and various mental and physical activities designed to imitate real astronaut training.

Permanent exhibits
In addition to traveling exhibits such as Titanic: The Artifact Exhibition and Mazes, the Science Center is home to the following permanent exhibits: Conservation Station, Everglades Exhibit, River of Grass, Hurricane Simulator, over 50 brain teasers, interactive outdoor science trail. miniature golf and States of Matter.

See also

 Phillip and Patricia Frost Museum of Science

References

External links
 Official website

Museums in West Palm Beach, Florida
Planetaria in the United States
Science museums in Florida